Maupin is a city in Wasco County, Oregon, United States. Located on the Deschutes River, much of the city's economy is related to the river through outdoor activities, such as fishing and rafting. The population was 418 at the 2010 census.

History
Maupin is named for Howard Maupin, a pioneer who had a farm and ferry at the town's location in the late 19th century. Originally named Hunts Ferry after the owner of a ferry on the Deschutes River, the name was changed to Maupin Ferry by town founder William H. Staats. The city's name was shortened to Maupin in about 1909.

Geography
Road access is provided by U.S. Route 197, which crosses the Deschutes River in town at one of the few places the Deschutes can be crossed north of Madras.

Climate
This region experiences warm (but not hot) and dry summers, with no average monthly temperatures above .  Being in the high desert, the nights cool down from the daytime heat.  According to the Köppen Climate Classification system, Maupin has a warm-summer Mediterranean climate, abbreviated "Csb" on climate maps.

Demographics

As of the census of 2010, there were 418 people, 199 households, and 113 families residing in the city. The racial makeup of the city was 95.7% White, 0.7% Native American, 0.2% Asian, 0.2% Pacific Islander, 0.2% from other races, and 2.9% from two or more races. Hispanic or Latino of any race were 1.2% of the population.

There were 199 households, of which about 20% had children under the age of 18 living with them, about 50% were married couples living together, 3.5% had a female householder with no husband present, 3% had a male householder with no wife present, and about 43% were non-families. About 41% of all households were made up of individuals, and about 21% had someone living alone who was 65 years of age or older. The average household size was 1.98 and the average family size was 2.65.

The median age in the city was about 56 years. About 15% of residents were under the age of 18; about 5% were between the ages of 18 and 24; 15.5% were from 25 to 44; 32.8% were from 45 to 64; and about 32% were 65 years of age or older. The gender makeup of the city was about 51% male and 49% female.

Education
Maupin is served by the South Wasco County School District, a two-school district that comprises Maupin Grade School and South Wasco County Junior/Senior High School, both of which are in Maupin.

See also
Boxcar Fire

References

External links
 Maupin Area Chamber of Commerce
 Entry for Maupin in the Oregon Blue Book

Cities in Oregon
Cities in Wasco County, Oregon
1922 establishments in Oregon